is a national expressway in Osaka Prefecture, Japan. It is owned and operated by West Nippon Expressway Company. In conjunction with the Chūgoku Expressway and the Osaka Chūō Kanjōsen of Osaka Prefectural Road 2, it will form a full outer ring road of Osaka. The expressway is designated with the number E26 under the Ministry of Land, Infrastructure, Transport and Tourism's "2016 Proposal for Realization of Expressway Numbering."

Route description

The route originates from its junction with the Meishin Expressway and Chūgoku Expressway and extends east shortly, then southward. At its southern terminus it connects to the Nishi-Meihan Expressway and Hanwa Expressway. Tolls are charged at a flat rate (currently 510 yen for a regular passenger car). The speed limit is 60 km/h on the section between Suita Junction and Ibaraki Toll Gate and 80 km/h on all other sections.

History
The first section of the expressway was opened to traffic in 1970 to coincide with the opening of Expo 70 in Osaka. The final section of the expressway (4.8 km between Yao Interchange and Matsubara Junction) was opened on 17 March 1988.

Junction list
The entire expressway is in Osaka Prefecture.

References

External links
 West Nippon Expressway Company

Expressways in Japan
Roads in Osaka Prefecture